
Gmina Łęka Opatowska is a rural gmina (administrative district) in Kępno County, Greater Poland Voivodeship, in west central Poland.

Villages
Gmina Łęka Opatowska contains the villages and settlements of Biadaszki, Klasak, Kuźnica Słupska, Łęka Opatowska, Lipie, Marianka Siemieńska, Opatów, Opatowiec, Piaski, Raków, Siemianice, Stogniew, Szalonka, Trzebień, Wesoła, and Zmyślona Słupska.

Neighbouring gminas
Gmina Łęka Opatowska is bordered by the gminas of Baranów, Bolesławiec, Byczyna, Trzcinica, and Wieruszów.

References
 Polish official population figures 2006

Leka Opatowska
Kępno County